Yunnanilus niger is a hypogean species of stone loach endemic to China. This species is endemic to the endorheic drainage system which feeds the Datangzi Marsh in Luoping County, Yunnan,

References

N
Taxa named by Maurice Kottelat
Taxa named by Chu Xin-Luo
Fish described in 1988
Taxonomy articles created by Polbot